Leif Thybo  (12 June 1922 – 24 January 2001) was a Danish organist and composer. He studied theory with Vagn Holmboe before entering the Royal Danish Academy of Music where he was taught instrumentation by Poul Schierbeck, organ by Emilius Bangert, and theory by Finn Høffding. His music is characterized by a clarity of expression and stringency of construction.

He was a professor of music theory at the Royal Danish Academy of Music from 1965 to 1990. Amongst his pupils are the composers María Luisa Ozaita and Frederik Magle.

Notable works
 Preludio, pastorale e fugato, op.11 (1948)
 Preludium (1950)
 Concerto per organo (1953–54)
 Concerto (1956)
 Passacaglia con Intermedios (1961)
 Contrasti per organo (1965)
 Liber organi (1967)
 Compenius-suite (1968)
 Mouvement Symphonique (1979)

See also
 List of Danish composers

References

External links
 A Portrait of Danish Composer Leif Thybo

Danish classical organists
Male classical organists
Danish classical composers
Danish male classical composers
1922 births
2001 deaths
20th-century classical composers
Royal Danish Academy of Music alumni
Pupils of Finn Høffding
Pupils of Vagn Holmboe
Composers for pipe organ
20th-century organists
20th-century Danish male musicians